Fernando Urdapilleta (5 August 1924 – 17 August 2013) was an Argentine equestrian. He competed in two events at the 1960 Summer Olympics.

References

1924 births
2013 deaths
Argentine male equestrians
Olympic equestrians of Argentina
Equestrians at the 1960 Summer Olympics
Pan American Games medalists in equestrian
Pan American Games gold medalists for Argentina
Pan American Games silver medalists for Argentina
Equestrians at the 1951 Pan American Games
Sportspeople from Buenos Aires
Medalists at the 1951 Pan American Games